Princess Tokushi (篤子内親王; 1060–1114) was a princess and an Empress consort of Japan. She was the consort of her nephew, Emperor Horikawa.

Life
She was the fourth daughter of Emperor Go-Sanjō and his cousin Imperial Princess Kaoruko, and the sister of Emperor Shirakawa.  

Her father died in 1073 and was succeeded by her brother Emperor Shirakawa, who abdicated favoring his son - Emperor Horikawa - in 1087.  In 1093, the fourteen-year-old Emperor married his paternal aunt, Princess Tokushi. 

In 1107, she ordained as a Buddhist nun. She had no children.

Notes

Japanese empresses
1060 births
1114 deaths
Japanese princesses
Japanese Buddhist nuns
12th-century Buddhist nuns
Daughters of emperors